Åkerman is a Swedish surname. Notable people with the surname include:

Gustaf Åkerman (1888–1959), Swedish economist
Gustav Åkerman (1901–1988), Swedish Army lieutenant general
Johan Åkerman (born 1972), Swedish ice hockey player
Lisbeth Åkerman (born 1967), Swedish journalist
Malin Åkerman (born 1978), Swedish-Canadian model and actress

See also
Akerman
Akkerman (disambiguation)
Ackerman (surname)
Ackermann (surname)
Akkerman (surname)
Ackermans (disambiguation)

Swedish-language surnames